Rodney Eric Kennedy (20 August 1909–14 October 1989) was a New Zealand artist, art critic, pacifist and drama tutor. He was born in Dunedin.

References

1909 births
1989 deaths
Artists from Dunedin
New Zealand pacifists
New Zealand art critics